The RS Quba is a one or two man monohull dinghy in the RS Sailing range of sailing boats. It is a popular boat for beginners.

Performance and design
The RS Quba is a suitable dinghy for introducing newcomers to the sport of sailing. The shallow cockpit is spacious but is also light enough to be handled by children. The RS Quba is quick to rig, easy to carry on the roof-rack and demands virtually no maintenance. The RS Quba is ideal to teach the youngsters, cruise around the bay or even race with the more powerful Pro rig. The Sport mainsail has a crude roller reefing system and a jib can be added for sailing with two people. The hull is a highly durable Comptec PE3 construction system.

References

External links
 RS Sailing (Global HQ)
 ISAF Connect to Sailing
 International RS Classes Association
 UK RS Association
 German RS Class Association

Dinghies
Sailboat type designs by Paul Handley
Sailboat types built by RS Sailing